The Harvard College Project for Asian and International Relations (HPAIR) is a student-led not-for-profit organization associated with the Harvard University Faculty of Arts and Sciences. HPAIR currently holds two annual conferences that bring together international students and eminent individuals in the fields of academia, politics and business - the Harvard Conference and the Asia Conference.

Established in 1991, HPAIR aims to enable distinguished students to participate in an open forum on Asian and international issues with global leaders in fields ranging from international relations to technology and the fine arts.

HPAIR is an organization run entirely by Harvard University. HPAIR's Asia Conference is Harvard University's largest annual student event in Asia. Since its founding in 1991, HPAIR has held over 40 conferences in locations ranging from Mumbai to Kuala Lumpur.

Harvard Conference

The Harvard Conference was first held in 2008 on the Harvard University campus. Each year, up to 600 international students and young professionals come together at the Harvard Conference to explore pertinent issues concerning the Asia region, including equitable access to global health, foreign policy, environmental issues, media, and entrepreneurship. Attendees have the opportunity to discuss these issues in-depth through plenary sessions, panels, seminars, and case studies.

Harvard Conferences by Theme

Asia Conference

The HPAIR Asia Conference is a 5-day academic program in mid-August in an Asian city. The conference integrates the contents of the academic and business world to create a hybrid structure. Delegates benefit from gaining a broader exposure to issues spanning multiple arenas, including political, social, economic, cultural, and business.

The 2019 Asia Conference was held in Kazakhstan from August 16–20, co-organized by Nazarbayev University in Nur-Sultan, Kazakhstan.

There are six conference tracks, namely:

 Art, Media & Culture
 Energy and Environmental Stability
 Global Markets & the Economy
 Governance & Geopolitics
 Science & Technology
 Social Policy & Justice

The Asia Conference started off in 1992 in Taipei, back then known as the Academic Conference. Bringing together a diverse group of speakers and about 300 graduate and undergraduate students from across the world, the Academic Conference takes the form of six workshops that explore, through research and discussion, issues ranging from environmentalism to cultural trends.

In 2004, HPAIR started the Business Conference, which invited many prominent figures from the world of business, government and law to discuss their understanding of Asia and its place in the global economy with more than 300 business students and young professionals. As of 2012, HPAIR has merged the Academic Conference and the Business Conference into a single conference, the Asia Conference, which brings together 600 pre-eminent young professionals from around the world.

Asia Conference in Previous Years

Notable Speakers

HPAIR conferences are often led by a diverse group of speakers prominent in various areas of society.

Conferences have drawn many top-tier political leaders such as former President of the Republic of Korea Kim Dae-jung, Crown Prince of Perak Raja Nazrin Shah, Finance Minister of the Republic of the Philippines Dr. Jesus P. Estanislao, and President of Singapore S. R. Nathan. The former Foreign Minister of the Republic of Korea and the current Secretary-General of the United Nations Ban Ki-moon has spoken at an HPAIR conference.

Many speakers also hail from influential international organizations, like the United Nations or the Association of Southeast Asian Nations (ASEAN). Speakers from ASEAN include the current Secretary-General of ASEAN Surin Pitsuwan and the former Secretary-General of ASEAN Ong Keng Yong.

HPAIR often invites speakers who are successful in the world of business, like the Chairman and CEO of Ayala Corporation Jaime Augusto Zobel de Ayala (Harvard '81 / HBS '87), CEO of Haier Zhang Ruimin, Chairman of Prudential Asia Victor Fung and President of Goldman Sachs Asia Philip D. Murphy.

References

External links 
 The Harvard College Project for Asian and International Relations Website

Harvard University